Kapitsa may refer to:
 Pyotr Kapitsa - Soviet physicist, Nobel prize winner
 Andrey Kapitsa - Soviet geographer and Antarctic explorer, discoverer of Lake Vostok
 Sergei Kapitsa - Soviet physicist
 3437 Kapitsa (1982 UZ5) - main-belt asteroid discovered in 1982 by L. G. Karachkina, named after Pyotr Kapitsa

See also 
 Kapitsa–Dirac effect